The Dermott Bank & Trust Company Building is a historic commercial building at the northwestern corner of the junction of North Arkansas and East Iowa Streets in Dermott, Arkansas.  The single story Classical Revival building was home to the Dermott Bank & Trust Company, a bank that operated under various guises between 1911 and 1931, apparently all at this address.  It later served as part of a building supply store, and as a warehouse.

The building was listed on the National Register of Historic Places in 1994.

See also
National Register of Historic Places listings in Chicot County, Arkansas

References

Bank buildings on the National Register of Historic Places in Arkansas
Neoclassical architecture in Arkansas
Commercial buildings completed in 1910
Buildings and structures in Chicot County, Arkansas
National Register of Historic Places in Chicot County, Arkansas
Dermott, Arkansas